Quartz Hill is located on the border of Alberta and British Columbia on the Continental Divide. It is named due to the top of the mountain is mostly quartz.

See also
 List of peaks on the Alberta–British Columbia border
 Mountains of Alberta
 Mountains of British Columbia

References

Quartz Hill
Quartz Hill
Canadian Rockies